Sela pri Šentjerneju is a settlement south of Šentjernej in southeastern Slovenia. The Municipality of Šentjernej is part of the traditional region of Lower Carniola. It is now included in the Southeast Slovenia Statistical Region.

Name
The name of the settlement was changed from Sela to Sela pri Šentjerneju in 1953.

References

External links
Sela pri Šentjerneju on Geopedia

Populated places in the Municipality of Šentjernej